Sapna Sappu (born Zarina Sheikh) is an Indian actress, producer and director who worked predominantly in Hindi Indian films. She entered the film industry in the movie Gunda, which was directed by Kanti Shah and she was given a role as Mithun Chakraborty's sister. In a career spanning over 20 years, she appeared in over 250 films in Hindi, Bhojpuri and Gujarati languages. In 2020 Sapna Sappu returned in the hit Adult TV series Aap Kee Sapna Bhabhi.

Early life 
Sappu was born on 1 May 1980 as Zarina Sheikh in a Muslim Family in Nasik. She featured in most of her movies from 1998 to present. She has started acting and producing adult series since 2020.

Personal life 
On 20 July 2013, Sappu married Rajesh Goyal, a businessman from Gujarat, India. They have one son, Shaurya After her marriage, Sapna relocated to Gujarat, India, for few years. After her disputes with her husband, she moved back to Mumbai with her son to pursue a career in cinema again. She appeared in various films in multiple languages.

Selected filmography 

Since 2019, Sapna Sappu started web series with different sites, appearing in erotic see through tops, featuring in fuming hot scenes with boys and guys. She as started her own websites as well.

References

External links
 
 
 

Living people
Actresses in Hindi cinema
Indian television actresses
Indian Hindus
Indian former Muslims
21st-century Indian actresses
Actresses in Bhojpuri cinema
Actresses from Mumbai
20th-century Indian actresses
Converts to Hinduism from Islam
1980 births